Prairie Home Township is one of fourteen townships in Cooper County, Missouri, USA.  As of the 2000 census, its population was 554.

Geography
According to the United States Census Bureau, Prairie Home Township covers an area of 33 square miles (85.46 square kilometers); of this, 32.97 square miles (85.39 square kilometers, 99.92 percent) is land and 0.03 square miles (0.07 square kilometers, 0.08 percent) is water.

Cities, towns, villages
 Prairie Home

Adjacent townships
 Saline Township (north)
 Linn Township, Moniteau County (east)
 North Moniteau Township (southwest)
 Clark Fork Township (west)

Cemeteries
The township contains these five cemeteries: Ellis, Harris, New Salem, Providence and Robison.

Major highways
  Missouri Route 87

School districts
 Boonville School District
 Prairie Home R-V School District

Political districts
 Missouri's 6th congressional district
 State House District 117
 State Senate District 21

References
 United States Census Bureau 2008 TIGER/Line Shapefiles
 United States Board on Geographic Names (GNIS)
 United States National Atlas

External links
 US-Counties.com
 City-Data.com

Townships in Cooper County, Missouri
Townships in Missouri